Garden in the City is a Melanie album released by Buddah Records in 1972.  Although marketed as an album of new recordings it was actually a compilation of "leftover" songs from Melanie's time at that label and released without her consent, after she left to form her own record label.  Two of the songs had been previously released on the soundtrack album to the movie R. P. M. (produced by Barry De Vorzon & Perry Botkin, Jr.) in 1970.

The United Kingdom release of the album had a "scratch 'n' sniff" label on the sleeve with the message "Rub gently to release the magic of Melanie's Garden."

The song "People in the Front Row" was later sampled by Australian hip hop group Hilltop Hoods for their song "The Nosebleed Section".  Melanie was reportedly pleased with the use of her song in this recording.

Track listing
All songs written by Melanie Safka except where noted.
"Garden in the City"
"Love in My Mind"
"We Don't Know Where We're Going" (Barry De Vorzon, Perry Botkin Jr.)
"Lay Lady Lay" (Bob Dylan)
"Jigsaw Puzzle" (Mick Jagger, Keith Richards)
"Don't You Wait By The Water"
"Stop! I Don't Wanna Hear It Anymore" (Barry De Vorzon, Perry Botkin Jr.)
"Somebody Loves Me" (Ballard MacDonald, Buddy DeSylva, George Gershwin)
"People in the Front Row"

Charts

Singles

References

1972 albums
Melanie (singer) albums
Buddah Records albums